Usha Rani Tomar was a member of the 8th Lok Sabha of India. She represented the Aligarh (Lok Sabha constituency) of Uttar Pradesh and is a member of the Indian National Congress party.

References

India MPs 1984–1989
Living people
Politicians from Aligarh
1969 births
Lok Sabha members from Uttar Pradesh
Women in Uttar Pradesh politics
20th-century Indian women politicians
20th-century Indian politicians
Indian National Congress politicians from Uttar Pradesh